KG, Kg, kG or kg may refer to:

Units of measurement
 kg, the kilogram, the SI base unit of mass
 kG or kGs, the kilogauss, a unit of measurement of magnetic induction

People
 KG (wrestler), ring name of Syuri (born 1989)
 K. G. Cunningham (born 1939), Australian radio presenter and cricketer
 Kevin Garnett (born 1976), nicknamed KG, American basketball player
 Kyle Gass (born 1960), nicknamed KG, American musician of Tenacious D
 Kagiso Rabada (born 1995), nicknamed KG, South African cricketer

Places 
 Bad Kissingen, Germany, vehicle registration code KG
 Kragujevac, Serbia, vehicle registration code KG
 Kyrgyzstan, ISO 3166 country code KG
 .kg, Internet country code top-level domain for Kyrgyzstan

Transportation 
 , a Venezuelan airline, IATA airline designator KG
 Ship's center of gravity above keel

Other uses 
 K.G. (album), a 2020 album by King Gizzard & the Lizard Wizard
 , the highest state court in Berlin, Germany
 , a military combat formation
 kg, a digraph used in orthographies of several languages; see List of Latin-script digraphs#K. 
 Kindergarten, pre-school education
 Klein–Gordon equation, a relativistic wave equation
 Knight of the Garter, a member of a British order of chivalry
 , a German limited partnership business entity
 , a company in Indonesia
 Kongo language, ISO 639-1 language code kg

See also

 King, the title given to a male monarch